Serial Killers is an American hip hop supergroup formed in 2013 and composed of rappers B-Real, Xzibit and Demrick. The trio self-released their debut mixtape, Serial Killers Vol. 1, on October 31, 2013. Matt Alonzo directed a music video for their first single, "The First 48".

Discography

Mixtapes

Singles 
"First 48" (2013)

Appearances

References

External links 

2013 establishments in the United States
American hip hop groups
Musical groups established in 2013
Hip hop supergroups